Hadhrami or Hadrami may refer to:
Hadhrami people, people inhabiting the Hadhramaut region in Yemen 
Hadhrami Arabic, a dialect of Arabic spoken by the Hadhrami people
Hadhrami Sheikhdom, one of the five sheikdoms of Upper Yafa in Southern Arabia

See also
 Hadrami (disambiguation)

Language and nationality disambiguation pages
Arabic words and phrases